Jeremy John Baumberg,  (born 14 March 1967) is Professor of Nanoscience in the Cavendish Laboratory at the University of Cambridge, a Fellow of Jesus College, Cambridge and Director of the NanoPhotonics Centre.

Education
Baumberg was born on 14 March 1967. He was educated at the University of Cambridge where he was an undergraduate student of Jesus College, Cambridge and awarded a Bachelor of Arts degree in Natural Sciences in 1988. He moved to the University of Oxford where he was awarded a Doctor of Philosophy degree in 1993. During his postgraduate study he was a student of Jesus College, Oxford and supervised by John Francis Ryan where his doctoral research investigated nonlinear optics in semiconductors.

Career and research
Following his PhD, Baumberg was a visiting IBM Research fellow at the University of California, Santa Barbara (UCSB) from 1994 to 1995. He returned to the UK to work in the Hitachi Cambridge Lab from 1995 to 1998 before being appointed Professor of Nano-scale Physics at the University of Southampton from 1998 to 2007 where he co-founded Mesophotonics Limited, a Southampton University spin-off company.

Baumberg's research is in nanotechnology, including nanophotonics, plasmonics, metamaterials and optical microcavities. He is interested in the development of nanostructured optical materials that undergo unusual interactions with light, and his research has various commercial applications.

His early work led to the development of a number of pioneering experimental techniques. Highlights of Baumberg's research include his work on confining light to the nanoscopic scale and plasmonic interactions with metals; the ultrafast dynamics of magnetic semiconductors, which made a significant contribution to the area of spintronics; work on coherent control in solids; and studies of semiconductor microcavities. During his career he has supervised numerous PhD students and postdoctoral researchers in his laboratory and his research has been funded by the Engineering and Physical Sciences Research Council (EPSRC) and the Biotechnology and Biological Sciences Research Council (BBSRC).

Baumberg holds patents on coherent control, supercontinuum generation chips, plasmon filters, photonic crystal lasers, Surface-enhanced Raman spectroscopy (SERS) substrates and solar cells. He appeared as himself on the documentary The Secret Life of Materials in 2015 and a Horizon documentary about Schön scandal first broadcast in 2004.

Baumberg's book The Secret Life of Science: How It Really Works and Why It Matters was published in May 2018.

Awards and honours
Baumberg has received several awards for his research including the Mullard Award in 2004 and Rumford Medal in 2014, both from the Royal Society. The Institute of Physics (IOP) awarded Baumberg with the Silver Young Medal and Prize in 2013 and the Gold Faraday Medal and Prize in 2017. Baumberg was elected a Fellow of the Royal Society (FRS) in 2011, a Fellow of The Optical Society of America in 2006 and has been a Fellow of the Institute of Physics (FInstP) since 1998.

Personal life
Baumberg is the son of the late Simon Baumberg OBE, a microbiologist and who served as Professor of bacterial genetics  at the University of Leeds from 1996 to 2005.

References

Fellows of the Royal Society
Fellows of the Institute of Physics
Fellows of Jesus College, Cambridge
Alumni of Jesus College, Cambridge
British materials scientists
Living people
1967 births
Alumni of Jesus College, Oxford